Hawkfest is three-day outdoor weekend festival organised and centered on Hawkwind. The event is open only to members of their fanclub and is limited to around 1000 attendees.

The stated intention is to recreate the atmosphere of festivals of old, as an alternative to the currently heavily commercialised events, and to make the whole event as family-friendly as possible with side attractions and workshops.

2002
Date: 19–21 July 2002
Location: Three Horseshoes Farm, nr. Seaton, Devon, England.

Schedule
Friday: Bedouin, Mr Quimby's Beard, Bruise, Litmus
Saturday: Hawkwind, Astralasia (with Simon House & Pete Pracownik), Spacehead, Tribe of Cro, The One Eyed Bishops, Proteus
Sunday: Huw Lloyd Langton's Broken Bits Band (Huw Lloyd Langdon, Mr Dibs, Martin & Jack Griffin, Lloyd George, Mik), Judge Trev, Connecting Routes, Tim Blake
Acoustic Tent: Jez Huggett's Band of Gold

Hawkwind set
Set: Intro; Earth Calling; Night Of The Hawks; Flying Doctor; LSD; For Kirsty; Strange Flower; Lighthouse; Spiral Galaxy; Spirit Of The Age; Damnation Alley; The Watcher; Brainbox Pollution; You Shouldn't Do That; Earth Calling Reprise; Motorway City; Hurry On Sundown
Line-Up: Dave Brock; Alan Davey; Simon House; Tim Blake; Richard Chadwick; Danny Thompson; Huw Lloyd Langton; Jez Huggett; Keith Kniveton; Captain Rizz

CD release
CD1
Hawkwind - "Night Of The Hawks"
Proteus - "Evenstar" / "Cloud City"
Tribe of Cro - "I Have No Life"
Spacehead - "Fire Dragons"
Astralasia - "Uncle Sam's On Mars"
Jez Huggett's Band of Gold - "Kansas City Blues" 
CD2
Bruise - "Miss Bigfish"
Connecting Routes - "Intro"
Mr Quimby's Beard - "Mystery"
Bedouin - "LSD"
Litmus - "Invader" 
Huw Lloyd Langton's Broken Bits Band - "Cardboard City"
The One Eyed Bishops - "Hurry On Sundown"

2003
Date: 8–10 August 2003
Location: Garstang, nr. Preston, Lancashire, England 
Info: The first 500 ticket holders received a free limited-edition CD promo for the Hawkfest 2002 2CD.

Schedule
Friday: Arthur Brown and Instant Flight, Big Amongst Sheep 
Saturday: Hawkwind, Harvey Bainbridge, Spacehead, Litmus, Mr. Quimby's Beard
Sunday: Drunk In Public, Sophia Dean 
Barn: Afresco Mantis, Alien Dream, Assassins of Silence, Tribe of Cro, Tarantism

Hawkwind set
Set: Arrival In Utopia; Time Captives; The Watcher; Magnu; Chronoglide Skyway; The Right Stuff; Wings; Hurry On Sundown; Brainbox Pollution; Spirit of the Age; Green Finned Demon; In The Trees; Abducted; Angela Android; Assault & Battery; The Golden Void; Where Are They Now?; Assassins of Allah; Master of the Universe 
Line-Up: Dave Brock; Simon House; Alan Davey; Richard Chadwick; Arthur Brown; Keith Barton; Mr. Dibs; Harvey Bainbridge; Huw Lloyd Langton; Keith Kniveton

2007
Date: 15–17 June 2007
Location: Donington Park Farmhouse, Melbourne Road, Isley Walton, Castle Donington, Leicestershire, England.

External links
2002: Mission Control Starfarer
2003: Mission Control Starfarer
2007: Mission Control

Hawkwind
Music festivals in England
Counterculture festivals